Stephen Potter (1900–1969) was a British writer. Other people with this name are:

 Stephen Potter, Australian filmmaker, co-writer, director and producer, with Natasha Wanganeen and others, of Bunker: The Last Fleet
 Stephen Potter, leader of the defunct For Darwen Party in Blackburn, England
Stephen Potter (judge) (1727–1793),  an American judge and politician in Rhode Island
Stephen Potter (officer) (1896–1918), an American-born officer who flew for the British Navy in World War I, after whom USS Stephen Potter is named